Krekenava is a town (population 1,375) in Panevėžys district municipality in northern Lithuania, on the bank of Nevėžis.

History
From 1409 it was the center of Upytė poviat, the first wooden church built by Vytautas the Great in 1419. Nearby Krekanava is a birthplace of the painter Roman Szwoynicki (1845–1915).

In July and August 1941, an Einsatzgruppen of Lithuanian nationalists massacred the Jewish residents of the town, about 50 grownups and  60 children. Along with Jews they also shot so-called Communists and Soviet activists, in all about 190 people. The massacre took place in a ditch between the old and new cemeteries.

Economy 
1975 is a year of beginning of JSC “Krekenavos Agrofirma” activities, a company which employs over 900 people. “Krekenavos agrofirma” allocates its investments for the two priority fields – improvement of the quality of its activities, and production expansion.

Gallery

References

External links 
 About "Krekenavos Agrofirma"

Towns in Lithuania
Towns in Panevėžys County
Ponevezhsky Uyezd
Holocaust locations in Lithuania
Panevėžys District Municipality